Manuel Gibrán Lajud Bojalil (born 25 December 1993) is a Mexican professional footballer who plays as a goalkeeper for Liga MX club Santos Laguna.

Club career

Early career
Lajud joined the youth academy of Cruz Azul in 2009, and made his way up the ranks through the academy, playing for the under-17 and under-20 squads. He was called up to the first team.

Tijuana
Lajud joined Tijuana on loan for the 2014–15 season. On 26 July 2014, he made his professional debut against Club América. He came on as a substitute for the injured Cirilo Saucedo in the 73rd minute.

After the retirement of Federico Vilar, Lajud was named the starting goalkeeper for Tijuana.

International career

Mexico 
Lajud was called up to the senior Mexico squad for a friendly against Bosnia and Herzegovina in January 2018. He did not appear in the match. He made his debut for Mexico in a 3–2 friendly win over Costa Rica on 10 December the same year.

Lebanon 
During the 2022 FIFA World Cup qualification, the Lebanese Football Association attempted to include Lajud to play for Lebanon, after Lebanon qualified for the third round; Lajud has yet to complete the FIFA one-time switch requirement in order to join the Lebanese national football team.

Personal life
Lajud is of Lebanese descent. He received his Lebanese passport on 6 November 2021.

Career statistics

International

Honours
Mexico U20
CONCACAF U-20 Championship: 2013

Mexico U23
Central American and Caribbean Games: 2014
CONCACAF Olympic Qualifying Championship: 2015
Pan American Silver Medal: 2015

Individual
CONCACAF Olympic Qualifying Championship Best XI: 2015
CONCACAF Olympic Qualifying Championship Golden Glove: 2015

References

External links
 
 
 Gibrán Lajud at ESPN Deportes 
 
 

1993 births
Living people
Footballers from Mexico City
Mexican people of Lebanese descent
Mexican footballers
Association football goalkeepers
Cruz Azul footballers
Club Tijuana footballers
Santos Laguna footballers
Liga MX players
Olympic footballers of Mexico
Mexico international footballers
Footballers at the 2015 Pan American Games
Medalists at the 2015 Pan American Games
Pan American Games medalists in football
Pan American Games silver medalists for Mexico
Footballers at the 2016 Summer Olympics
Sportspeople of Lebanese descent
Citizens of Lebanon through descent